Gosht or ghosht refers to tender meat, cooked for a long time, and used as an ingredient in a number of Middle Eastern cuisine, Central Asian cuisine and cuisine of the Indian subcontinent. The word stems from the Persian word gosht , meaning "meat" or "flesh", especially that of goat.

In India, most gosht dishes include goat or mutton. In India, the term mutton is more likely to refer to the meat of a goat rather than that of an adult sheep, as it does elsewhere in the English-speaking world. When Indian dishes are adapted for Western diners, lamb is the meat most often used in the adaptation. This has led to a common misconception that gosht means "lamb".

The popular Indian subcontinental dish of Biryani as well as the Afghan dish of Biryan use Gosht as a primary ingredient.

Some dishes include:

 Bhuna gosht, a curry with a thick, reduced sauce
 Karahi or Kadhai gosht, cooked in a traditional round-sided pot
 Raan gosht, roasted leg of mutton
 Dal gosht, with lentils or peas
 Nihari gosht, a meat stew
 Rara gosht, roasted mutton curry 
 Saag gosht, with cooked spinach leaves or mustard greens
 Biryani gosht, especially the non-vegetarian version of it

References

Bengali curries
Indian curries
Pakistani curries
Pakistani meat dishes
Persian words and phrases
South Asian curries
Urdu-language words and phrases
Bengali words and phrases
Bengali cuisine
Bangladeshi cuisine